Treloar is a Cornish surname, now most common in Australia and North America.

Etymology

Treloar is a habitational surname originating from Wendron, Cornwall, England. It means "homestead with garden", taken from Cornish tre homestead and lowarth garden. The 'w' was later dropped and subsequently, the 'th'.

People with the surname Treloar
 
Adam Treloar, Australian rules football player
Cameron Treloar, Australian rugby union player for Union Bordeaux Bègles in the Top 14
John Treloar (athlete) (born 1928), retired track and field athlete, considered to be one of Australia's greatest male sprinters
John Treloar (museum administrator) OBE (1894–1952), Australian archivist and the second director of the Australian War Memorial (AWM)
LRG Treloar, author and rubber engineer
Lucy Treloar, Australian novelist
Margaret Treloar, Canadian food scientist, product development expert, Chairman of the World Association of Girl Guides and Girl Scouts
Peter Treloar, Australian politician elected in 2010
Phil Treloar (born 1946), Australian jazz drummer, percussionist and composer
Thomas Treloar (1892–1953), Australian politician
William M. Treloar (1850–1935), American music professor, composer, music publisher, and U.S. Representative from Missouri
Sir William Treloar, 1st Baronet (1843–1923), manufacturer and philanthropist and Lord Mayor of the City of London
Nicholas Treloar, (born 2002), machine learning researcher

See also
Treloar, Missouri, unincorporated community in southern Warren County, Missouri, United States
Treloar College, secondary school and sixth-form college for physically disabled students in Alton, Hampshire, England
Treloar Copyright Bill, revision of the United States copyright laws introduced February 13, 1896
Treloar School, non-maintained special school for disabled children in Alton, Hampshire, UK
Treloar's Hospital Platform railway station

References
 

de:Treloar
vo:Treloar